Sowch-e Pain (also Romanized as Sowch-e Pā’īn; also known as Sowch-e Soflá) is a village in Balvard Rural District, in the Central District of Sirjan County, Kerman Province, Iran. At the 2006 census, its population was 32, in 8 families.

References 

Populated places in Sirjan County